The 2018–19 SVGFF Premier Division is the seventh season of the SVGFF Premier Division, the top-tier football in Saint Vincent and the Grenadines under its current format, and it is also the 12th season of top flight football altogether. The season started on 13 October 2018.

League table

References

NLA Premier League
Saint Vincent and the Grenadines
1